is a specific set of cultural trends that arose during the  era in Japan.  is a  word derived from the English words erotic, grotesque, and nonsense.

Overview

Apt to its namesake, this period of time in Japan saw a large increase in the release of literature, magazines, news articles, and music centered around erotic grotesqueness. The popularization of such media arose during the advent the Great Depression (1929) and died down following the February 26 incident. After the publishing of Edogawa Ranpo's short story, in the magazine  in 1928, Japanese society saw a boom of bizarre and grotesque media. That same year, Yumeno Kyūsaku published his novel . The 1932 publication of  marks the peak of this boom. In 1936, Kyūsaku died shortly after the release of his novel . The boom of bizarre media ended around this time.

The massive news coverage of the Sada Abe incident in May 1936 is seen as a pivotal element of the  movement. Shortly afterwards, the popular song , released earlier in March of the same year, was banned from airing in June on the grounds that it was too erotic. The  period is said to have ended with the start of NHK  radio broadcasts during the same month.

Along with several books which had managed to avoided censorship by the Ministry of Home Affairs, books of this theme that had been banned during this period are often circulated through book-buying clubs as underground books and are subject to study and analysis. Many books of this era were banned for their propoundment of radical ideologies such as anarchism, but most were banned on the grounds of their  content.

After the conclusion of World War II, censored books of this period resided in the National Diet Library as "Banned Books held under Possession by the National Diet Library", but some books were confiscated by American forces during the Occupation of Japan. The National Diet Library has worked with the American Library of Congress to digitize this content, including material that would have been considered obscene back in the day, but are not by today's standards (e.g. Kiyoshi Sakai's (ja) ). Much of this content is free to view online if copyright laws have allowed for it to be available as such. Pages that had been censored from these books have also been re-released to the public under these archives. However, because of the relatively recent commencement of public access to these libraries, there have been few in-depth analyses of the works. With the efforts of librarians such as Noritada Ōtaki (ja), endeavors to encourage studies of these books and further extensions of access to the public have been made. However, of the roughly 11,000 books banned during this period, the National Diet Library only holds about 7,000. The rest of the books exist only in personal collections or are lost works.

Unlike books which have gained the reputation of being "underground" after being banned, books that were written to be circulated discreetly and thus avoid charges of obscenity are rarely held by the National Diet Library, so researchers make an effort to hunt down the books themselves. Even publishers of these books may not know the whereabouts of any existing copies, making knowledge of these books scarce in underground-literature circles. In 2011, a specialist in and collector of banned books, Jō Ichirō, donated roughly 7,000 books of this nature to Meiji University.

Censorship 

Under the Empire of Japan, all major publications were heavily monitored by the Home Ministry Police Affairs Bureau and, in some cases, censored. Books, news articles, and magazines containing  material were immediately subject to prohibition from being sold or published. Standards for censorship were not well understood, and even works such as Sakutarō Hagiwara's  (which became considered a masterpiece after World War II) had its first edition banned from sale.

In the 1920s, major publishers began to take preemptive measures to avoid censorship and implemented "private perusal". In a system of prepublication self-censorship, they consulted official censors and erased words from their content that would have faced scrutiny for obscenity before they were even printed. These efforts eventually allowed for the abolition of "private perusal" in many publishers in the following year.

The liberal atmosphere of the time fostered a rebellious temperament amongst the publishing industry, one which disregarded the censorship and bans placed upon their books. As usual, the censorship was strict, and some publishers still self-censored, but many companies played around with the law in various ways; for example, some included a "Table of Omitted Words" as a piece of paper attached to their books, so the reader understand what was being censored.

In theory, a book banned under this policy would not be able to make it onto the market. However, many of the books of this nature managed to circumvent the authorities through various means.  literature gained a reputation for being "underground" as they were circulated through secret buying clubs. One method used to avoid censorship was to conduct "guerrilla releases", in which the released books were to be almost completely sold out before delivering them to the Home Ministry for review. A few copies of the books would be kept specifically to be confiscated if the Home Ministry deemed it to be unworthy for public release. A list released post-World War II by one of the buying clubs distributing these works, revealed the then-president of Dai-ichi Tokyo Bar Association, Kiyosaku Toyohara, along with many other intellectuals of the time, as members of the buying club. To describe such books as "underground" may be an overstatement, as the scale of these operations were quite large, evidenced by lawyers who testified against such buying clubs.

Large publishing companies during this time period also engaged in guerrilla releases. The boom in  media inspired  and other large publishers such as Shinchosha to release large amounts of bannable content.

There were no laws during this period regarding audio media and as a result, erotic music developed into a popular genre of the time. In 1934, a revision on publishing legislation made audio media subject to censorship and bans, though enforcement of these laws was relatively low for a while.

In 1936, enforcement of censorship began to increase and under the Public Order and Police Law of 1900, old music and audio records were also subject to banning. The first record to be censored was a comic dialogue, on the grounds that it was "too playful" (""). Another popular song at the time, "" was banned and copies withdrawn for being too erotic, warranting the offense of "disturbing public law and order, damaging customs". This led to the introduction of a  pre-emptive self-censorship system in the Japanese recording industry, conducted with the consultation of officials from the Home Ministry.

Because punishment for publishing media that was banned was minimal (the maximum jail sentence was under two years, but most publishers were simply fined), there were some people who specialized in publishing such media. However, one such writer named Hokumei Umehara (ja) was placed under constant surveillance and eventually deported from Japan.

In 1925, a new law termed the Peace Preservation Law was put in place to suppress political dissent. The punishment for breaking this law was to be put to death. Offenders were known to be placed under imprisonment by the Special Higher Police without trial and brutally tortured. However, this punishment wasn't usually enforced on  media produced by underground publishers. Kaizōsha faced multiple bans on its left-wing publications (for example Takiji Kobayashi's 1929 novel ), but these were only subject to normal publication laws, not the Public Security Preservation Law.  Kaizōsha went on publishing writers like Edogawa Ranpo without any subsequent bans. Because of this, it is theorized that the Home Ministry tacitly consented to the left wing's  subculture under the premise that it kept its "eroticism over terrorism" and "pink over red". However, this may also simply be because the distinction between socialist publications and  publications is rather vague in publication legislation. In his book ,  researcher Aratsuki Hiroshi emphasizes that proletarian literature of the era was "sexually perverted" and "erotic and grotesque".

In the years following 1936, the censorship began to be enforced even more as the Second Sino-Japanese War begun. As a result,  publications were restricted, and publishers who once advocated the  culture lost their rebellious temperament. Edogawa Ranpo, whose work largely contributed to the boom of  media in the 1930s was struck with a ban on his short story , and much of his previous books went out of print.

After the downfall of the liberal atmosphere that fostered  culture during the Second Sino-Japanese war, it experienced a revival during the post-war generation, termed  (アプレゲール).

After the establishment of the Constitution of Japan,  media still faced suppression. Notably, Michiyo Kogura, a writer and member of  arrested before wartime, resumed his writings after the war, but was arrested again in 1957 in violation of Article 175 of the Penal Code. It was only after 1970, with the relaxation of laws dealing with obscene media that  content was completely free of legislative scrutiny. After 2010, the National Diet Library started to publish its collection of banned literature onto its online digital collection.

See also

 Literary modernism
 Proletarian literature
 Underground culture
 
 Edogawa Ranpo

References

External links
 

Book censorship
Censorship in Japan
Ero guro
Japanese popular culture
Japanese words and phrases
Underground culture